Chopin is a Polish brig built in 1999 by Wioska Żeglarska Krzysztof Kosiński. She sails the Great Masurian Lakes - the Bełdany Lake, Mikołajki Lake and Śniardwy Lake.

Design
Chopin is designed on the lines of a 19th-Century brig. As well as her sails, she is propelled by two engines of  each.

History

Chopin was built at Płonsk in 1999 by Wioska Żeglarska Krzysztof Kosiński for Polska Telefonia Cyfrowa. Until 2001, she was moored at Warsaw whilst being fitted out. Chopin took part in an event associated with the 2001 Cutty Sark Tall Ships races. In 2005 the ship was bought by its builder and current owner Krzysztof Kosinski. Current sponsor of the ship is Gaspol SA. Her home port was Wierzba until 2006, when it was changed to Mikołajki.

Chopin sails the Great Masurian Lakes - the Bełdany Lake, Mikołajki Lake and Śniardwy Lake from mid-April to mid-November. She has a capacity of 70 passengers and up to 120 guests are allowed on board when she is in port.

References

See also
 Chopin (disambiguation)

1999 ships
Brigs
Tall ships of Poland
Passenger ships of Poland